Richard P. Tinkham (June 24, 1932 – October 14, 2018) was an American sports executive who was the co-founder of the American Basketball Association with Joe Newman.

Biography 
Tinkham grew up in Hammond, Indiana. He graduated from DePauw University, where he was on the varsity basketball and relay teams, before earning his law degree from the University of Michigan law school in 1957. He later served in the United States Marine Corps, where he reached the rank of captain and served as general court martial counsel. Afterwards, he started a legal practice in Indianapolis, and chaired the ABA–NBA merger.

In 1967, he co-founded the original ABA and the Indiana Pacers franchise, serving for two years as President of the ABA Board of Trustees. Tinkham was also owner and executive of the Pacers franchise, and was responsible for its early success. He hired Mike Storen, then business manager of the Cincinnati Royals, as the first general manager of the Pacers. Tinkham and Storen had first met while serving in the Marines together. In 1972-75, he was instrumental in the creation of Market Square Arena in Indianapolis.

Tinkham died on October 14, 2018 from muscular dystrophy at the age of 86.

References

1932 births
2018 deaths
American Basketball Association executives
Deaths from muscular dystrophy
DePauw Tigers men's basketball players
Indiana Pacers executives
Sportspeople from Hammond, Indiana
University of Michigan Law School alumni
American men's basketball players